Blagoveshchensk is a city and the administrative center of Amur Oblast, Russia. It is located at the confluence of the Amur and the Zeya Rivers, opposite to the Chinese city of Heihe. Population: 

The Amur has formed Russia's border with China since the 1858 Aigun Treaty and the 1860 Treaty of Peking. The area north of the Amur belonged to the Manchu Qing dynasty by the Treaty of Nerchinsk of 1689 until it was ceded to Russia by the Aigun Treaty in 1858.

History

Early history of the region
The early residents of both sides of the Amur in the region of today's Blagoveshchensk were the Daurs and Duchers. The Grodekovo site is thought by archaeologists to have been populated since ca. 1000 CE.

As the Russians tried to assert their control over the region, the Ducher town was probably vacated when the Duchers were evacuated by the Qing to the Sungari or Hurka in the mid-1650s. Since 1673, the Chinese re-used the site for their fort ("Old Aigun", in modern literature), which served in 1683-1685 as a base for the Manchus' campaign against the Russian fort of Albazin further north.

The series of conflicts between Russians and China ended with  Russia's recognition of the Chinese sovereignty over both sides of the Amur by the Nerchinsk Treaty of 1689.

Russian settlement
As the balance of power in the region had changed by the mid-19th century, the Russian Empire was able to take over the left (generally northern, but around Blagoveshchensk, eastern) bank of the Amur from China. Since the 1858 Aigun Treaty and the 1860 Treaty of Peking, the river has remained the border between the countries, although the Qing subjects were allowed to continue to live in the so-called Sixty-Four Villages east of the Amur and the Zeya (i.e., within today's Blagoveshchensk's eastern suburbs).

Tsar Alexander II gave approval for the founding of the city in 1858 as the seat of government for the Amur region, to be named Blagoveshchensk (literally "the city of good news") after the parish church which was dedicated to the Annunciation. According to Blagoveshchensk authorities, by 1877 the city had some 8,000 residents, with merely 15 foreigners (presumably, Chinese) among them.

The city was an important river port and trade center during the late 19th century, with growth further fueled by a gold rush early in the 20th century and by its position on the Chinese border opposite the city of Heihe.

Local historians noted the pre-eminence of Blagoveshchensk in the economy of the late 19th century Russian Far East, which was reflected when the heir to the Russian throne, Nicholas Alexandrovich (the future Tsar Nicholas II), visited in 1891 during his grand tour of Asiatic Russia, and the locals presented him with bread and salt on a gold tray, rather than on a silver one as in other cities of the region.

The Boxer Rebellion
In the course of the Boxer Rebellion, the Qing Imperial army (made out of Manchus and Han Chinese) and Boxer insurgents shelled the city in July 1900. Chinese Honghuzi forces joined the attack against Blagoveshchensk. According to the Orthodox belief, the city was allegedly saved by a miraculous icon of Our Lady of Albazin, which was prayed to continuously during the shelling which lasted almost two weeks.

On 3 July (Old Style), a decision was made by the city's Police Chief Batarevich and the Military Governor Gribsky to deport the city's entire community of Qing subjects including ethnic Manchus, Daur people and Han, numbering 4,008), who were viewed as potential fifth columnists. As cross-river shipping was interrupted by the rebellion, the question arose how to get them from the Russian to the Chinese side of the Amur. Batarevich suggested that the deportees could be first taken east of the Zeya, where they should obtain boats from the local Chinese villagers. The plan, however, was vetoed by the governor, and the decision was made instead to take the deportees to the stanitsa of Verkhneblagoveshchenskaya—the place where the Amur is at its narrowest—and make them leave Russia there. As the local ataman refused to provide boats to take them across the river (despite the orders of his superior), few of them made it to the Chinese side. The rest drowned in the Amur, or were shot or axed by the police, Cossacks and local volunteers, when refusing to leave the bank. Local Chinese memory holds that a massacre that took place then, at the hand of Cossacks, which killed so many that the Amur River was choked. According to Chinese sources, about 5,000 people reportedly died during these events of 4-8 July 1900. 

There were 1,266 households in the city, including 900 Daurs and 4,500 Manchus until the massacre. Many Manchu villages were burned by Cossacks in the massacre according to Victor Zatsepine.

This expulsion of the local Chinese caused some hardships for Blagoveshchensk consumers. For example, during the second half of 1900 it became almost impossible to buy any green vegetables in the town, and ten eggs would cost 30-50 kopecks (and in winter, as much as a rouble), while before it had been possible to buy ten eggs for 10-15 kopecks.

The massacre angered the Chinese, and had ramifications for the future: the Chinese Honghuzi fought a guerilla war against Russian occupation and assisted the Japanese in the Russo-Japanese War against the Russians in revenge. Louis Livingston Seaman mentioned the massacre as being the reason for the Chinese Honghuzi hatred towards the Russians:The Chinaman, be he Hung-hutze or peasant, in his relation to the Russians in this conflict with Japan has not forgotten the terrible treatment accorded him since the Muscovite occupation of Manchuria. He still remembers the massacre at Blagovestchensk when nearly 8,000 unarmed men, women, and children were driven at the point of the bayonet into the raging Amur, until — as one of the Russian officers who participated in that brutal murder told me at Chin-Wang-Tao in 1900 — "the execution of my orders made me almost sick, for it seemed as though I could have walked across the river on the bodies of the floating dead." Not a Chinaman escaped, except forty who were employed by a leading foreign merchant who ransomed their lives at a thousand roubles each. These, and many even worse, atrocities are remembered and now is their moment for revenge. So it was easy for Japan to enlist the sympathy of these men, especially when emphasized by liberal pay, as is now the case. It is believed that more than 10,000 of these bandits, divided into companies of from 200 to 300 each and led by Japanese officers, are now in the pay of Japan.

Civil war and the Soviet era

The city was also the site of conflict during the Russian Civil War, with Japanese troops occupying the city in support of the White Army. From 1920 until 1922, the city was declared part of the Far Eastern Republic, an area which was nominally independent, but in reality a buffer zone under control of the Russian SFSR. The city became the administrative center of Amur Oblast in 1932.

During the Cultural Revolution in China, the city was subject to Maoist propaganda blasted from loudspeakers across the river 24 hours a day.

Administrative and municipal status

Blagoveshchensk is the administrative center of the oblast and, within the framework of administrative divisions, it also serves as the administrative center of Blagoveshchensky District, even though it is not a part of it. As an administrative division, it is, together with six rural localities, incorporated separately as Blagoveshchensk Urban Okrug—an administrative unit with the status equal to that of the districts. As a municipal division, this administrative unit also has urban okrug status.

Politics
In July 2013, a public hearing was held at which citizens declared themselves to be in favor of a return to the direct election of the mayor. A meeting of deputies voted for rejection of the "two-headed" management. In September 2013, City Council voted for a return to the

Climate
Blagoveschensk experiences a monsoon-influenced hot-summer humid continental climate (Köppen Dwa), bordering on a monsoon-influenced warm-summer humid continental climate (Dwb) which it had before 1990. The city features frigid, windy, but dry winters due to the influence of the Siberian high, and warm, wet summers, due to the East Asian monsoon. On 1 August 2011, it became the first city in the Russian Far East to be hit by a tornado.

Economy
Since the dissolution of the Soviet Union, the city's economic focus has turned to border trade with China. The town is now home to a large Chinese expatriate community. Blagoveshchensk is part of a free trade zone which includes the Chinese city of Heihe, located on the other side of the Amur River.

Main industries in the town include metal and timber processing, as well as paper production.

Transportation

The city is served by a branch highway and railway connecting it to Belogorsk on the Trans-Siberian Railway and Trans-Siberian Highway. It is also served by a river port. On the other side of the Amur River is Heihe, Heilongjiang Province, China, which is the starting point of China National Highway 202 that goes south to Harbin and Dalian.

The Blagoveshchensk–Heihe Bridge, completed at the end of 2019, includes a 2-lane highway bridge over the Amur to link Blagoveshchensk and Heihe.

The world's first international cable car to Heihe has also been proposed to open in 2022.

Education

Universities
Amur State Medical Academy
Amur State University
Blagoveshchensk State Pedagogical University
Far Eastern Higher Combined Arms Command School
Far Eastern State Agricultural University
Finance University under the Government of the Russian Federation (Blagoveschensk Branch)
Maritime State University named after admiral Gennady Nevelskoy (Blagoveschensk Branch)
Modern University for the Humanities (Blagoveschensk Branch)
Moscow Academy of Business in Association with the Government of Moscow (Blagoveschensk Branch)

Sister city
 Heihe, Heilongjiang, China

See also

 Nikolay Muravyov-Amursky
 Amur Cossacks

References

Notes

Sources

External links
Official website of Blagoveshchensk 
Blagoveshchensk Business Directory 
Video: Tornado in Blagoveshchensk, July 31, 2011

 
Amur Oblast (Russian Empire)
Russian Far East
China–Russia border crossings
Populated places established in 1856
1856 establishments in China
Renamed localities in Russia